This list of states in the Holy Roman Empire includes any territory ruled by an authority that had been granted imperial immediacy, as well as many other feudal entities such as lordships, sous-fiefs and allodial fiefs. 

The Holy Roman Empire was a complex political entity that existed in central Europe for most of the medieval and early modern periods and was generally ruled by a German-speaking Emperor. The states that composed the Empire, while enjoying a unique form of territorial authority (called Landeshoheit) that granted them many attributes of sovereignty, were never fully sovereign states in the sense that term is understood today. In the 18th century, the Holy Roman Empire consisted of approximately 1,800 such territories, the majority being tiny estates owned by the families of Imperial Knights. This page does not directly contain the list but discusses the format of the various lists and offers some background to understand the complex organisation of the Holy Roman Empire. The lists themselves can be accessed via the alphabetical navigation box below; each letter will lead the reader to a page on which states of the Empire that began with that letter are listed.  For a more complete history of the empire, see Holy Roman Empire.

Table of states
While any such list could never be definitive, the list attempts to be as comprehensive as possible. It is sorted alphabetically and split into separate articles linked in the box below.

There is also a separate list of Free Imperial Cities, as well as a list of participants in the Imperial Diet as of 1792.

Key 
The "Circle" column shows the Imperial Circle (Reichskreis) that the state belonged to.
The "Bench" column shows where the state was represented in the Imperial Diet (Reichstag).
 

 
Note that in the "Circle" column, "n/a" denotes a state that had ceased to exist before the Reichsreform.
 
Other abbreviations used in the list are:

Definition of terms

Hochstift: the territory ruled by a bishop as a prince.
Imperial Abbey (Reichsabtei): an abbey with imperial immediacy. Its head was a Reichsabt, literally 'Imperial Abbot' or 'Abbot of the Empire'.  A monastery with similar status was a Reichskloster.
Imperial Circle (Reichskreis, plural Reichskreise): a regional grouping of states of the Holy Roman Empire, primarily for the purpose of organising a common defence and of collecting imperial taxes, but also as a means of organisation within the Imperial Diet.
Imperial Diet (Reichstag): the parliament of the Holy Roman Empire. The same name was used in the North German Confederation and in Germany until 1945.
Imperial Estate (Reichsstand, plural Reichsstände): an entity in the Holy Roman Empire with a vote in the Imperial Diet. Several states had no seats in the Empire, while some officials (such as the Hereditary Usher) were non-voting members; neither qualified as Imperial States.
Imperial Free City (freie Reichsstadt): a city formally responsible to the emperor only – as opposed to the majority of cities in the Empire, which belonged to the territory of one of the many princes (Fürsten) of the Empire, such as dukes or prince-bishops. Free cities also had independent representation in the Imperial Diet of the Holy Roman Empire.
Imperial immediacy (Reichsfreiheit or Reichsunmittelbarkeit; adjectives reichsfrei, reichsunmittelbar) was a privileged feudal and political status, a form of statehood within the Holy Roman Empire. The ruler of an immediate city, abbey or territory had no overlord other than the Holy Roman Emperor and the Imperial Diet. Immediate states had the right to collect taxes and tolls themselves, and held juridical rights (including the Blutgericht, 'high' justice including capital punishment) themselves. De facto, immediacy corresponded to a semi-independence with a far-reaching autonomy.
Imperial Reform: In 1495, an attempt was made at a Diet in the city of Worms to give the disintegrating Holy Roman Empire a new structure, commonly referred to as Imperial Reform (in German: Reichsreform).
Imperial State (Reichsstand, plural Reichsstände): an entity in the Holy Roman Empire with a vote in the Imperial Diet.
Kleinstaaterei is a German word mostly used to describe the territorial fragmentation in Germany and neighboring regions during the Holy Roman Empire (especially after the end of the Thirty Years' War). It refers to the large number of nearly sovereign small and medium-sized secular and ecclesiastical principalities and free imperial cities, some of which were little larger than a single town or the surrounding grounds of the monastery of an Imperial abbey.
Mediatization is the loss of imperial immediacy through annexation by a larger state.  A mediatized lord lost most of his power over his former territory, but retained his title and most of his personal privileges.
Prince of the Empire: any ruling Prince whose territory is a member of the Holy Roman Empire (not only German-speaking countries, but also many bordering and extensive neighbouring regions) and entitled to a voting seat (or in a collective voting unit, such as a Gräfenbank) in the Imperial Diet.
Prince-abbot (Fürstabt) or prince-abbess (Äbtissin): an abbot or abbess with the rank of prince. Prince-abbots (but not prince-abbesses) had a seat and vote on the Ecclesiastical Bench of the College of Ruling Princes of the Imperial Diet, where they sat alongside the prince-bishops.
Prince-bishop (Fürstbischof): a bishop with the rank, ex officio, of prince (Fürst). As a prince, he was the temporal ruler of a Hochstift; as a bishop, he exercised the spiritual duties of an ordinary bishop over his diocese, which was always larger than his Hochstift. Prince-bishops had seat and voice on the Ecclesiastical Bench of the College of Ruling Princes of the Imperial Diet. Nearly all the bishops of the Holy Roman Empire outside the Habsburg lands were prince-bishops.
Prince-elector or electoral prince (Kurfürst, pl. Kurfürsten): a member of the electoral college of the Holy Roman Empire, having the function of electing the Holy Roman Emperors.
Secularization: the transfer of property from ecclesiastical to civil possession or use.

Notes column

The "Notes" column shows, in capsule form,
 the territorial development of the different states or polities (acquisition or loss of possessions, union of rulers or dynasties, etc.);
 the royal or noble dynasties, including their various branches, which ruled over territories or polities;
 the transmission of succession rights (marriage, female succession, conquest, cession, pledge, etc.);
 the attributes of "statehood" (right to mint coins, holding markets and fairs, entering into treaties and pacts, appointment of civil officials, etc.); and
 the size of territory and population of the various polities whenever these are available.

Estate of the Empire (Reichsstand)
 
The following excerpt from François Velde's Unequal and Morganatic Marriages in German Law provides an excellent overview on what an Estate (or State) of the Empire is. For his purpose, the author deals only with the hereditary territorial rulers but it should be remembered that the Estates also included a substantial number of non-hereditary territorial rulers such as the ecclesiastical states (prince-bishoprics and imperial abbeys) and free imperial cities.

Grouped lists
The following lists are going to be included into the table above.

Ecclesiastical orders
 The Teutonic Order1529: College of Princes1793: Council of Princes
 The Order of St. John1793: Council of Princes

Livonian territories
 Terra Mariana (the Livonian Confederation from 1435):
 Archbishopric of Riga (from 1207, as Bishopric of Riga until 1255, subjugated directly to the Holy See in 1215, again from 1225, secularized and subjugated to the Kingdom of Poland and Grand Duchy of Lithuania in 1561)
 Livonian Order (secularized 16th century, secularized and subjugated to the Kingdom of Poland and Grand Duchy of Lithuania in 1561)
 Bishopric of Dorpat (from 1225, conquered by Russia in 1558)
 Bishopric of Ösel-Wiek (from 1228, sold to Denmark in 1560)
 Bishopric of Courland (from 1521, sold to Denmark in 1560)
 Roman Catholic Diocese of Reval (from 1521, incorporated into Sweden in 1561)
 Riga (from 1581, in effect in 1582, incorporated into the Polish–Lithuanian Duchy of Livonia in 1581)

Territories of old princely families
 Holstein-Gottorp
 Holstein-Gottorp-Oldenburg
 Holstein-Glückstadt

Italian territories
 Carrara
 Finale
 Florence
 Genoa
 Guastalla
 Lucca
 Mantua
 Massa
 Milan
 Modena and Reggio
 Montferrat
 Parma
 Piedmont
 Piombino
 Saluzzo
 Siena
 Tuscany

Territories of new princely families
 Thurn und Taxis, held Friedberg-Scheer (1754)

See also
 List of Imperial Diet participants (1792)
 List of historic states of Germany (after 1815)

References

Further reading

In English
The Arenberg Archives and Cultural Centre.  "The Dukes of Arenberg".  .  Retrieved June 26, 2006.
Austrian Federal Ministry for Education, Science and Culture. "aeiou: The Annotable, Elektronic, Interactive, Osterreich (Austria), Universal Information System".  .  Retrieved June 23, 2006.
"Austrian and German Mediatized Houses, 1871–1919".  .  Retrieved July 4, 2006.
"Braunschweig – Brunswick. A history".  .  Retrieved July 6, 2006.
Cahoon, Benjamin M. (2000–2006).  "Europe Index" in WorldStatesmen.org.  .  June 26, 2006.
Dotor, Santiago (2004).  "Historical Flags (Schleswig-Holstein, Germany)" in FOTW: Flags of the World Web Site.  .  Retrieved July 3, 2006.
"Freiburg's History for Pedestrians" (2006).  .  Retrieved June 26, 2006.
Graz, Thomas.  "Thomas's Glassware Tour to Central Europe: Old Glasses from Old Europe" in German History Ring.  .  Retrieved June 20, 2006.
Hilkens, Bob (2000).  "States and Regents of the World: An Alphabetical Listing of States and Territories and their Regents in the 19th and 20th Centuries".  [https://web.archive.org/web/20091027065258/http://www.geocities.com/CapitolHill/Rotunda/2209/index.html  Retrieved June 27, 2006.
"History of the House of Sayn".  .  Retrieved July 13, 2006.
Kane, Ed (2000).  "Castle Directory: Alphabetical Listing of German Castles and Fortifications".   .  Retrieved July 28, 2006.
 The History Files: Kingdoms of Europe.  Retrieved July 9, 2006 (Updated February 25, 2007).
"Lippe(-Detmold): Chronology of Lippe" in Genealogy.net.  .  Retrieved June 25, 2006.
Martinsson, Örjan.  "Historical Atlas: Europe".  .  Retrieved July 14, 2006.
"Medieval German Counties".  .  Retrieved July 9, 2006.
"Milestones in Pomeranian History, with particular attention to Lauenburg and Buetow".  .  Retrieved June 26, 2006.
Pantel, Mike (2000). "The History of Baden-Wurttemberg".  .  Retrieved June 25, 2006.
Principality of Liechtenstein.  "Liechtenstein at a Glance: History".  .  Retrieved June 25, 2006.
Reitwiesner, William Addams (1998).  "One of the major questions about the Mediatized Houses is the word 'Mediatized'.  What does it mean?".  .  Retrieved July 1, 2006.
Rozn, Val (1999–2003).  "The German Reigning Houses: Titles, territories, regnal chronologies".  .  Retrieved June 9, 2006.
Rozn, Val (2002).  "The Imperial Nobility and the Constitution of the Holy Roman Empire".  .  Retrieved July 16, 2006.
Rozn, Val (2002).  "The Last Years of the Ancient Empire".  .  Retrieved June 24, 2006
Sainty, Guy Stair. "European Royal Houses". .  Retrieved June 23, 2006.
Sainty, Guy Stair.  "The Knights of Saint John in Germany".  .  Retrieved July 1, 2006.
"Schaumburg-Lippe" in Genealogy.net.  .  Retrieved June 25, 2006.
"Sovereigns in Germany".  .  Retrieved June 22, 2006.
Voss, Hans Peter.  "History of Schleswig Holstein".  .  Retrieved July 3, 2006.

In other languages
Bursik, Heinrich (1998).  "Die Herrschaft Hohenberg und die Markgrafschaft Burgau".  .  For Google-translated English version .  Retrieved July 9, 2006.
"Das Fürstenhaus Bentheim-Tecklenburg".  . For Google-translated English version, see .  Retrieved July 11, 2006.
Höckmann, Thomas (2006).  "Territorial arrangement of North Rhine-Westphalia 1789". (Translation from the original in German through Google Search).  .  (Excellent articles and links about the States of the Holy Roman Empire).  Retrieved June 26, 2006.
"Mittelalterliche Genealogie im Deutschen Reich bis zum Ende der Staufer".  .  Retrieved June 23, 2006.
Ortwein, Friedrich J. "Die Herren zu Rappoltstein" (The Lords of Rappoltstein)". . .  Retrieved June 25, 2006.
"Die Reichsstände". .  Retrieved July 8, 2006.
Wember, Heinz.  "Die Genealogie (Genealogy) von Montfort: Bludenz, Bregenz, Feldkirch, Heiligenberg, Herrenberg, Langenargen, Pfullendorf, Rheinegg, Rothenfels, Sargans, Tettnang, Tosters, Tübingen, Vaduz, Wasserburg, Werdenberg, Zollern".  .  Retrieved June 23, 2006.
List of imperial circles of 1532
List of states of the Holy Roman Empire of 1521

Maps and illustrations
Höckmann, Thomas (2006).  "Historical maps – Germany at the end of the 18th century".  .  Retrieved June 26, 2006.
Westermann, Großer Atlass zu Weltgeschichte (in German; exquisite detailed maps)

External links
Carantha: History of Slovenia-Carantania
The Catholic Encyclopedia

Genealogie delle Dinastie Nobili Italiane (On ruling families and polities in present-day Republic of Italy)
HIS DATA: Historische Herrscher der Territorien (Adel)(German)
  (English translation)
Internet Medieval Sourcebook
Regional Research in German-speaking Countries
World Statesmen

German feudalism